Sherry Ingrid Veronica Fletcher (born 17 January 1986) is a female track and field sprinter from Grenada, who specializes in the 200 metres. Her personal best time is 22.67 seconds, achieved in June 2007 in Sacramento. This is the current Grenadian record. Fletcher also holds the Grenadian 100 metres record with 11.18 seconds, achieved during the heats at the 2007 Pan American Games.

In 2007, she won the bronze medal in this event at the Pan American Games, where she also finished fifth in the 100 metres. She then participated at the World Championships in Osaka where she reached the quarter-finals in the  100 and Semi Finals in the 200 metre sprint. Fletcher represented Grenada at the 2008 Summer Olympics in Beijing competing at the 100 metres sprint. In her first round heat she placed fifth in a time of 11.65 which was not enough to advance to the second round. Fletcher ran track collegiately at Louisiana State University and was the 2007 NCAA 100m champion winning with a time of 11.20 seconds.

She is the older sister of Grenadian Cricketer Andre Fletcher

Achievements

References
 sports-reference
 

1986 births
Living people
Grenadian female sprinters
Athletes (track and field) at the 2007 Pan American Games
Athletes (track and field) at the 2008 Summer Olympics
Pan American Games bronze medalists for Grenada
Pan American Games medalists in athletics (track and field)
LSU Lady Tigers track and field athletes
World Athletics Championships athletes for Grenada
Olympic athletes of Grenada
Medalists at the 2007 Pan American Games
Olympic female sprinters